Riche is a surname. Notable people with the surname include:

Claude Riche (1762–1797), French naturalist
Edward Riche (born 1961), Canadian writer
Le Riche, Italian drag queen
Martha Farnsworth Riche (born 1939), American census director
Nancy Riche (disambiguation), multiple people